The Ghamot National Park Ghamot National Park is another national park of Azad Kashmir. It is located in Neelam District of AJK and it was established in 2004. Conservation efforts in the Gumot National Park are funded by the Global Environment Facility Small Grants Programme and implemented by the Himalayan Wildlife Foundation. The national park is significant as it hosts a connected population of the threatened Himalayan Brown Bear of Pakistan, connected through a network of national parks in northern Pakistan including the Deosai National Park and Musk Deer National Park. The park also hosts a population of the threatened musk deer.

References 

Musk deer
National parks of Pakistan